The FOA (from ) is a trade union representing public sector workers in Denmark.

History
The union was established in December 1992, when the Danish Municipal Workers' Union merged with the Homeworkers' Union, forming the Union of Public Employees (FOA).  Changes in the health and social care sectors in Denmark had led to the two unions competing for the same members, and the merger intended to remove this competition.  Initially, it had four sectors: social and health care, cooking and cleaning, technology and service, and education.

Like its predecessors, the FOA affiliated to the Danish Confederation of Trade Unions (LO), becoming its third largest member.  Since 2019, it has been a member of the LO's successor, the Danish Confederation of Trade Unions (FH).

In January 2005, the Danish Union of Educators also merged into the FOA.    As of 2018, the union had 153,985 members.  The majority work for local and regional governments, in roles including nursing, firefighting, cooking, cleaning, building maintenance, and bus driving, although a minority work in similar roles in the private sector.

Leadership

Presidents
1992: Poul Winckler
2005: Dennis Kristensen
2018: Mona Striib

Vice-Presidents
1992: Margit Vognsen
2004: Mona Striib
2018: Thomas Enghausen

References

External links
 

Danish Confederation of Trade Unions
Public sector trade unions
Trade unions in Denmark
Trade unions established in 1992